The Neon is the eighteenth studio album by English synth-pop duo Erasure, released on 21 August 2020 by Mute Records. The album debuted at number four on the UK Albums Chart with 8,394 copies sold in its first week.
 
On 30 July 2021, Erasure released a companion remix album titled The Neon Remixed, a double disc of remixes by Octo Octa, Paul Humphreys, Gareth Jones and others. A new single was also contained within the album titled "Secrets". The album was released on CD and a limited-edition coloured vinyl.

Background
The Neon was released on 21 August 2020 by Mute Records and is self-produced.

The album was recorded in Atlanta and mixed in London. The band has stated that they tried to return to their original sounds. Clarke used some of his older synths and Bell described the new album as "going back to the beginning".

The album cover was created by Paul A. Taylor. Bell said of the cover: "I love the effect of an old stone wall with a neon sign on it. To me, that always looks like the clashing of antiquity and modern-day."

The lead single "Hey Now (Think I Got a Feeling)" received its UK premiere on BBC Radio 2's The Zoe Ball Breakfast Show. "Fallen Angel" was released on 22 October 2020 as the album's third official single and debuted at number six on the UK Physical Singles Chart.

The band has stated that they usually record 10 songs for each album, but this time around they recorded many more and the record company picked the best. The remaining will be released at some point.

The album did not chart in the Billboard 200, but peaked at number 22 in the Billboard Current Album Sales chart and number 7 on the Billboard Top Dance/Electronic Albums chart.

Reception
The album has received generally positive reviews.

Track listing

The Neon Remixed
The Neon Remixed is a two-disc set of remixes from The Neon, released on 30 July 2021 by Mute Records. In addition to remixes, it also includes the single "Secrets". It debuted at number 33 on the UK Albums Chart, selling 2,255 units in its first week.

Disc one

Disc two

Charts

References

2020 albums
Erasure albums
Mute Records albums